School Streets is an initiative in the United Kingdom to implement School Streets outside schools. A school street is a road outside a school with a part-time restriction on motor traffic outside schools during drop-off and pick-up times. The programme is supported by Sustrans, a sustainable transport non-profit in the UK.

One of the first schools to trial the scheme was Gayhurst Community School in Hackney in 2018. As of November 2020, Transport for London has funded 430 new school streets. Legislatively, the scheme is achieved by restricting access to motor vehicles at certain times.

Nearly two-thirds of UK teachers are in favour of roads around schools being closed. A study has shown that School Streets reduce Nitrogen Dioxide levels by up to 23 per cent during morning drop-off.

The scheme aims to:

 reduce traffic volume near schools
 improve air quality and reduce air pollution from engine idling
 increase walking and cycling to school
 reduce car travel and inconsiderate parking
 promote social distancing during the COVID-19 pandemic

History 
In 2014 a group of Transport Planners from Camden Council went to visit Amsterdam and the surrounding areas to investigate innovations in the local area.  A chance conversation with a local transport planner raised the idea of closing the streets outside schools at the start and end of the school day using fire gates.

In The Netherlands it is standard practice to avoid building schools by roads because of the danger caused by roads to children, and because roads by schools encourage more driving to school.

Further investigations highlighted individual examples of schools that had implemented measures like this which appeared to be associated with much better levels of walking or cycling to school - for example, Waingel's Copse School in Reading which banned student drop-off/pickup during the start and end of school day period.

This idea evolved into "Healthy School Streets" involving folding bollards in the street being put up by school staff at the start and end of the school day, with road being formally closed by signage, and the staff merely implementing the bollards to enforce - and the first scheme was implemented in 2015 "How%20To"%20guide%20published a report acting as a "How To" guide published.

This initial school delivered significant reductions in driving to school of the order of 50% reduction in driven trips. 

At about the same time, Transport Planners in Edinburgh were working on their own "School Streets" project using signage, rather than folding bollards.

From 2017 onwards, other local authorities, supported in some cases by Transport Planners at Camden providing advisory support, implemented further school streets using similar methodology - or in some cases using more expensive camera enforcement with fines, to allow some residents to be exempt from the road closures.

In March 2018, some parents in Belgium closed the road outside their school instead of going for coffee. They called the movement . Over the next two weeks, 42 more schools joined as well. In 2021 some London boroughs have a high proportion of school streets. In Merton, 41% of schools have a school street. They are also being rolled out in Cumbria

Criticism 
One limitation of the scheme is that the time restrictions during drop-off and pick-up only do not help to reduce pollution during other times when children are outside, and do not tackle the wider street network which would allow many more children to walk or cycle to school.  

However, because once the schemes are implemented these weaknesses become apparent, highlighting the need for wider change, these measures can be a crucial step on the route to better streets. 

In 2021, some residents in Ilford, Greater London, opposed the introduction of 10 new School Streets in their borough, Redbridge. They said that the traffic would just move to another area. Instead, they favoured introducing a no stopping zone, which would allow through-traffic to continue. To date, evidence suggests there is no displacement to nearby streets and that overall, motor traffic does decrease overall.

See also
Low traffic neighbourhood

References 

Road infrastructure in the United Kingdom